Jadval-e Torki (also Romanized as Jadval-e Torkī and Jadval Torkī; also known as Joturki and Jūtorkī) is a village in Jereh Rural District, Jereh and Baladeh District, Kazerun County, Fars Province, Iran. At the 2006 census, its population was 1,471, in 311 families.

References 

Populated places in Kazerun County